Iyinoluwa Samuel Aboyeji (born March 28, 1991) is a Nigerian entrepreneur. He is a co-founder of Andela, and was the former managing director of Flutterwave. Aboyeji was cited as one of the Top 100 most influential Africans by New African magazine in 2019.

Education
Aboyeji attended Loyola Jesuit College, where he completed his senior secondary in 2007. Afterward he went to Columbia International College and earned a bachelor's degree in legal studies from the University of Waterloo.

Career
Aboyeji is the general partner and co-founder of Future Africa, a platform that provides capital, coaching and community for mission-driven innovators.

After co-founding Future Africa, he served as the deputy director-general for Oby Ezekwesili's 2019 presidential campaign. Aboyeji helped in building Andela and Flutterwave, two African technology companies.  He is also the Co-founder and Chairman of the Talent City Inc, a construction company.

References

External links
 

Living people
1991 births
Yoruba businesspeople
University of Waterloo alumni
21st-century Nigerian businesspeople
Nigerian chairpersons of corporations
Nigerian technology businesspeople